The 1991–92 Southern Football League season was the 89th in the history of the league, an English football competition.

Bromsgrove Rovers won the Premier Division to earned promotion to the Football Conference. Wealdstone, Poole Town, Fisher Athletic (who had just been relegated from the Conference) and Gravesend & Northfleet were all relegated from the Premier Division, whilst Solihull Borough (in their first season in the Southern League), Hastings Town, Hednesford Town and Weymouth were all promoted to the Premier Division, the former two as champions. Only two clubs, Alvechurch and Gosport Borough, were relegated from the Southern League, whilst Hythe Town folded and Rushden Town merged with United Counties League club Irthlingborough Diamonds to form Rushden & Diamonds.

Premier Division
The Premier Division consisted of 22 clubs, including 19 clubs from the previous season and three new clubs:
Corby Town, promoted from the Midland Division
Fisher Athletic, relegated from the Football Conference
Trowbridge Town, promoted from the Southern Division

League table

Midland Division
The Midland Division consisted of 22 clubs, including 19 clubs from the previous season and three new clubs:
Rushden Town, relegated from the Premier Division
Solihull Borough, promoted from the Midland Combination
Yate Town, transferred from the Southern Division

At the end of the season Stroud reverted name to Forest Green Rovers, while Rushden Town merged into new club Irthlingborough Diamonds, who took over place in the Midland Division.

League table

Southern Division
The Southern Division consisted of 22 clubs, including 18 clubs from the previous season and four new clubs:
Braintree Town, promoted from the Eastern Counties League
Havant Town, promoted from the Wessex League
Sittingbourne, promoted from the Kent League
Weymouth, relegated from the Premier Division

League table

See also
Southern Football League
1991–92 Isthmian League
1991–92 Northern Premier League

References

Southern Football League seasons
6